Puseyia is a genus of moths in the family Cossidae.

Species
 Puseyia puseyiae Dyar, 1937
 Puseyia hiscelis Dyar, 1937
 Puseyia ban Dyar, 1937

References

External links
Natural History Museum Lepidoptera generic names catalog

Hypoptinae
Cossidae genera